Wolfpen Creek may refer to:

Wolfpen Creek (Kansas), a stream in Kansas
Wolfpen Creek (Indian Creek tributary), a stream in Missouri